Jan Jerzy Grabowski (before 1767 – 1789) of the Topór coat of arms was a Polish noble, general (from 1782), marshal of the Słuck Confederation (1767).

He was twice married: first to Joanna Gruszczyńska and secondly to Elżbieta Szydłowska. Some of the children of his second marriage are thought to have actually been children of the last Polish–Lithuanian Commonwealth king, Stanisław August Poniatowski, whose mistress Elżbieta was.
 
Grabowski was one of the few Calvinist politicians of modern Poland.

18th-century births
1789 deaths
18th-century Polish nobility
Polish generals
18th-century Polish–Lithuanian military personnel
18th-century Polish–Lithuanian politicians